Elections in Korea can refer to:
 Elections in North Korea
 Elections in South Korea